Edward Abramson (September 21, 1920 – May 10, 2012) was an American politician who served in the New York State Assembly from the 32nd district from 1973 to 1990.

He died of pneumonia and kidney failure on May 10, 2012, in Chiang Mai, Thailand at age 91.

References

1920 births
2012 deaths
Democratic Party members of the New York State Assembly
Deaths from pneumonia in Thailand
Deaths from kidney failure